Selenotichnus is a genus of beetles in the family Carabidae, containing the following species:

 Selenotichnus klapkai Kataev & Wrase, 2006
 Selenotichnus olegi Kataev, 1999
 Selenotichnus parvulus Kataev & Wrase, 2006

References

Harpalinae